Quartermaster is a military term, the meaning of which depends on the country and service. In land armies, a quartermaster is generally a relatively senior soldier who supervises stores or barracks and distributes supplies and provisions. In many navies, a quartermaster is an officer with particular responsibility for steering and signals. The seaman is a non-commissioned officer (petty officer) rank; in some others, it is not a rank but a role related to navigation.

This term meant "master of quarters" (where "quarters" refers to lodging or accommodation). Alternatively, it could have been derived from "master of the quarterdeck" where the helmsman and captain controlled the ship. The term began to refer to army officers in English around 1600.

Land armies

For land armies, the term was first coined in Germany as Quartiermeister and initially denoted a court official with the duty of preparing the monarch's sleeping quarters. In the 17th century, it started to be used in various militaries in the sense of organizing supplies.

British Army
In the British Army and Royal Marines, the quartermaster (QM) is the commissioned officer in a battalion or regiment responsible for supply. By longstanding tradition, they are always commissioned from the ranks and hold the rank of captain or major (although until the 20th century the quartermaster was usually a lieutenant). Some units also have a technical quartermaster, who is in charge of technical stores. The quartermaster is assisted by the regimental quartermaster sergeant (RQMS) (and the technical quartermaster by the technical quartermaster sergeant (TQMS)) and a staff of storemen. The QM, RQMS and storemen are drawn from the regiment or corps in which they work, not from the Royal Logistic Corps (formerly the Royal Army Service Corps and then the Royal Army Ordnance Corps/Royal Corps of Transport), which is responsible for issuing and transporting supplies to them. Units which specialize in supply are known as "supply" units, not "quartermaster" units, and their personnel as suppliers or logistics specialists ("log specs"). Traditionally, the quartermaster had previously served as RQMS and then regimental sergeant major (RSM) of the unit of which he later became quartermaster.

From at least the English Civil War period until 1813, the quartermaster was the senior NCO in a British cavalry troop, in which context he had nothing to do with supply. In that year, the position was replaced by the new appointment of troop sergeant major, with the cavalry adopting commissioned, regimental quartermasters as described above.

Canadian Army
From Royal Canadian Ordnance Corps standing orders:

In recent years, the quartermaster has been a specially trained officer of the Royal Canadian Logistics Service, though CFR (commissioned from ranks) officers have been known to accept regimental appointments such as quartermaster.

Imperial Russian Army
The quartermaster was responsible for intelligence operations in the Imperial Russian Army.

United States Army

In the United States Army, the term is used to describe all supply personnel and units that are part of the United States Army Quartermaster Corps (USQMC) which was formerly the Quartermaster Department. It is a Sustainment, formerly combat service support (CSS), branch of the United States Army. It is also one of three U.S. Army logistics branches, the others being the Transportation Corps and the Ordnance Corps.

Swiss Army
In the Swiss Army, a quartermaster (Qm) is an officer (from 2 Lt. to colonel) in charge with the coordination of the Kommissariatsdienst (accountancy, post-service, fuel resupply, "all sort of food" resupply and others) of a battalion, regiment and brigade/division. His function is more a control and supervision function: a staff officer for the respective commander. The Qm has a direct subordinate at company level: it is the company quartermaster sergeant (QMS – the English definition for international engagement and also a new grade insignia = see "Gradstrukturen der Armee XXI_revidiert" since 2001 on Swiss army ranks). The company quartermaster sergeant is known since the 18th century as Fourier or Einheits-Fourier and has the rank equivalent of a senior non-commissioned-officer like the company sergeant major (since 2001 company chief sergeant major, CMS) and they are ranked (for better understanding in NATO-ranks even though Switzerland, as a neutral state, is not part of NATO) OR-7 in the senior NCO's category (in German: Höhere Unteroffiziere). For technical questions, the QMS is subordinated to the Qm officer (Qm 2 Lt, Qm 1 lt or Qm captain incorporated in the staff of a battalion/group). The tasks of resupply are assigned at company level to the two SNCO's (CSM and QMS). The QMS is the material executor of the Qm tasks at company level and for the command chain together with the CSM, directly subordinated to the company commander (captain) as staff NCOs. The Fourier is also the substitute of the chief sergeant major (Hauptfeldweibel), if considering the command platoon by itself.

Israel Defense Forces

In the IDF, the battalion quartermaster is also the commander of the battalions support company, known as the battalion headquarters company. In the standing army he is usually a captain, but the role is a major's role. In the reserve army he is usually a major. While most of the staff officers are directly under the command of the battalion commander, the quartermaster has a lieutenant, a logistics officer and a junior ordnance officer (the battalion's ordnance platoon commander) under his direct command. He is in charge of all logistics issues in the battalion and also in charge of the battalion's headquarter's day-to-day life.
He is commissioned as an officer by the ramatkal (the army's general chief of staff), and as a logistic officer by kalar (the army's general logistic officer).
In large camps and higher headquarters (brigade, division and corps HQ), apart from the staff officer in charge of logistics, there is also a role defined mostly as "camp commander," who is in charge of the HQ logistic issues, ceremonies and parades and discipline. These duties differ slightly in the air force and navy. The ranks of IDF quartermasters vary from sergeant major to CWO, depending on the size of the camp. However, most soldiers refer to him as rasar (the Hebrew acronym for the rank of 2WO) without regarding his actual rank. Quartermasters are identified (in all IDF branches) by wearing a blue-white aiguillette on their left shoulder.

Navies

Royal Navy
In the Royal Navy and Commonwealth navies (Royal Canadian Navy, Royal Australian Navy, Royal New Zealand Navy, Indian Navy, and South African Navy), the quartermaster is the senior member of the gangway staff when the ship is alongside and is responsible for supervising the boatswain's mate and the security of the brow. They are also responsible for steering the ship while at sea.

Belgian Navy
In Belgium, the naval ranks of quartermaster, chief quartermaster, and first chief quartermaster are used (in French: quartier-maître, quartier-maître-chef, premier quartier-maître-chef).

French Navy

In the French Navy, Quartermaster is a junior rank, equivalent to a French Army and Air Force Corporal. The French rank has nothing to do with supplies. This rank is also used by many other navies based on the French Navy.

Norwegian Navy
In the Norwegian navy, quartermaster is a rank equal to an army sergeant.

United States

U.S. Navy

The quartermaster is the enlisted member in charge of the watch-to-watch navigation and the maintenance, correction, and preparation of nautical charts and navigation publications. They are also responsible for navigational instruments and clocks and the training of ship's lookouts and helmsmen. They perform these duties under the control of the ship's navigator or other officer if there was no officer navigator. In the modern navy, a quartermaster is a petty officer who specializes in navigation. The rating abbreviation is QM. The symbol used for the rating and worn on uniforms is a ship's wheel. The colloquial form of address for a quartermaster is "Wheels". 

On U.S. Navy submarines, the job of a quartermaster is done by a qualified navigation electronics technician (NAV-ET). Along with the job of a Navy surface QM, NAV-ETs are also responsible for electronic systems that deal with navigation, internal communications, atmosphere monitoring, ship's entertainment systems, re-circulatory air systems (ventilation) and remote valve indication or manipulation.

After 2004, the U.S. Navy disestablished the signalman rating (SM); signalmen were responsible for visual communications, and many of the personnel and their responsibilities were incorporated in the QM rating.

The U.S. Navy rating dealing with supply and logistics is logistics specialist (LS) which would be equivalent to the Army quartermaster.

U.S. Coast Guard
The structure of ranks and job specialties of the United States Coast Guard is similar to that of the United States Navy. The Coast Guard used a quartermaster rating until the summer of 2003, when the rating was merged into the boatswain's mate rating.

The Coast Guard's quartermasters had the same duties as the Navy's, with the exception that—at some point after World War II—the Coast Guard folded the duties of its signalman rating into the quartermaster rating. Also, in recent decades, quartermaster was one of the only two Coast Guard enlisted ratings permitted to hold command of a small boat station (command otherwise being reserved for officers), with the other enlisted man's "command rating" being the boatswain's mate.

Pirate quartermasters
Pirates during the Golden Age of Piracy elevated the rank of quartermaster to much higher powers and responsibilities than it had aboard non-pirate merchant or naval vessels. On pirate ships, the quartermaster was often granted a veto power by a pirate ship's "Articles of Agreement", in order to create an officer who could counterbalance the powers of the pirate captain. Pirate quartermasters, like pirate captains, were usually elected by their crews.

It was often the quartermaster's responsibility to lead the pirate boarding party when boarding another ship. This was usually done from the quarter deck (the place where two ships touched during the boarding attack).

The quartermaster ranked higher than any other officer aboard the ship except the captain himself, and could veto the captain's decisions whenever the ship was not chasing a prize or engaged in battle. The quartermaster also was chiefly responsible for discipline, assessing punishments for crewmen who transgressed the articles. 

According to pirate Captain Charles Johnson, ghost author of the 18th century source, A General History of the Robberies and Murders of the most notorious Pyrates, aboard a pirate ship "the Captain can undertake nothing which the Quarter-Master does not approve. We may say, the Quarter-Master is a humble Imitation of the Roman Tribune of the People; he speaks for, and looks after the Interest of the Crew."

Several quartermasters, notably among them Calico Jack Rackham, became captains after their previous captain was killed or deposed.

Scouting
A Scout quartermaster within the Scout movement is responsible for maintaining all the normal camping supplies in a Scout troop or pack. This may include, but is not limited to, camping supplies, tents, "chuck boxes" (containers holding food and cooking supplies), stoves, camp fuel (propane, naphtha, etc.), tarps, camping trailers, dining flys, etc.

The Quartermaster Award is also the highest rank in the Sea Scouts, BSA, an older youth (age 13–21) co-ed program. A quartermaster (kwartiermeester) is in the Netherlands the assistant patrol leader of a Sea Scout patrol (Bak), in Flanders it is the patrol leader of a Sea Scout patrol (Kwartier).

In popular culture
 Long John Silver, the charming and lethal one-legged pirate from the novel Treasure Island, had been the pirate version of quartermaster under Captain Flint. It was noted he was the one man Flint had been afraid of.
 The character Q in the James Bond franchise, who supplies Bond with all his gadgets, is named Q for Quartermaster.
 The Rooster Teeth animated web series, Camp Camp, features a character simply referred to as "Quartermaster."
 The characters of Nigel Nesbett and Louis Litt served as quartermasters in the basic cable USA Network series “Suits,” where they oversaw office supplies and food & beverage provisions in the New York City law firm, “Pearson Darby.”
 The video game Tooth and Tail has a main character by the name of The Quartermaster.
In British policing, the department that issues uniform and supplies is known informally as the Quartermasters.

See also

Intendant (government official)
Quartermaster Center and School
Quartermaster Corps
Quartermaster general
Army Quartermaster Museum

References

External links

Navy Enlisted Occupational Standards for Quartermaster (QM) 
Quartermaster 1 and C Rate Training Manual
Website for Navy Quartermasters (QM)
Quartermaster (Band)

Nautical terminology
Marine occupations
Titles
Transport occupations
 
United States Navy ratings
Military ranks